Milenko "Mile" Ačimovič (born 15 February 1977) is a Slovenian former professional footballer who played as a midfielder. Besides Slovenia, he has played in FR Yugoslavia, England, France, Saudi Arabia, and Austria.

Club career
Born to Serbian parents in Ljubljana, Ačimovič started his career in the youth ranks of Železničar Ljubljana. He made four first division appearances for Železničar when he was 18 years old. From 1996 until 1998 he scored seven league goals in 36 matches for Olimpija. He then joined Red Star Belgrade, where he played for four and a half years. After successful appearances for the Slovenian national team in Euro 2000 and World Cup 2002, several bigger European clubs expressed interest in him. In the summer of 2002, he joined Tottenham Hotspur. In his first season in London, he made a few appearances, but never established himself as a first team player. In his second season, he became a fringe player.

In January 2004 he joined the French club Lille on loan until the end of the season. When he arrived, the club was in 14th place in the Ligue 1, but Ačimovič contributed to an eventual second-place finish, enough to qualify for the Champions League. Also, in his first year at Lille, he was part of the team's UEFA Cup campaign, when Lille reached the last sixteen before being eliminated.  The following year, he played in the third qualifying round of the Champions League, when Lille reached the group stages. Ačimovič scored Lille's only goal of the campaign against Manchester United in Lille's 1-0 victory in Paris.

After two-and one-half seasons in Lille, he fell out of favour and joined Al-Ittihad for the 2006–07 season. After failing to adapt to life in Saudi Arabia, he agreed on a mutual termination of the contract, subsequently moving back to Europe to join Austria Wien. On 15 September 2010, his ended his football career following a persistent right knee injury.

Ačimovič returned to Slovenia and was appointed the Director of football at Olimpija Ljubljana, in January 2011, where he stayed until September 2012 when he resigned his position, due to poor results of the team in the Slovenian PrvaLiga.

International career
He debuted for the Slovenia national team on 22 April 1998 in Murska Sobota against the Czech Republic. During the first leg of the UEFA Euro 2000 qualifiers against Ukraine, he scored a winning goal from near the halfway line, helping his team to qualify for their first ever major tournament. At the 2002 FIFA World Cup, Ačimovič scored in Slovenia's 3–1 defeat to Paraguay in Seogwipo. His final appearance for the national side came on 28 March 2007 in Celje, during a 1–0 home defeat to the Netherlands in a Euro 2008 qualification match. He announced his retirement from international football that August.

Honours
Lille
UEFA Intertoto Cup: 2004

See also
Slovenian international players

References

External links
 NZS profile 
 

Living people
1977 births
Footballers from Ljubljana
Slovenian people of Serbian descent
Slovenian expatriate footballers
Slovenian footballers
Association football midfielders
Association football wingers
NK Ljubljana players
NK Olimpija Ljubljana (1945–2005) players
Red Star Belgrade footballers
Tottenham Hotspur F.C. players
Lille OSC players
Ittihad FC players
FK Austria Wien players
Expatriate footballers in Serbia and Montenegro
Expatriate footballers in England
Expatriate footballers in France
Expatriate footballers in Saudi Arabia
Expatriate footballers in Austria
Slovenian expatriate sportspeople in Serbia and Montenegro
Slovenian expatriate sportspeople in England
Slovenian expatriate sportspeople in France
Slovenian expatriate sportspeople in Saudi Arabia
Slovenian expatriate sportspeople in Austria
Slovenian PrvaLiga players
Slovenian Second League players
Premier League players
Ligue 1 players
Saudi Professional League players
Austrian Football Bundesliga players
Slovenia youth international footballers
Slovenia under-21 international footballers
Slovenia international footballers
UEFA Euro 2000 players
2002 FIFA World Cup players
Slovenian football managers